Diocese of Calcutta may refer to:
Roman Catholic Archdiocese of Calcutta
Diocese of Calcutta of the Church of North India
Kolkata Orthodox Diocese